Rongé Island (also Curville Island, De Rongé Island, Isla Curville, or Rouge Island) is a high, rugged island  long, the largest island of the group which forms the west side of Errera Channel, off the west coast of Graham Land in Antarctica.

Rongé Island was discovered by the Belgian Antarctic Expedition (BAE) of 1897–1899 under Adrien de Gerlache who named it for Madame de Rongé (cousin of Johannes Ronge), a contributor to the expedition.

Geography 
Ketley Point forms the western end of Rongé Island. Sherlac Point marks the southeast end of the island. Both were charted by the Belgian Antarctic Expedition under Gerlache and named by the UK Antarctic Place-Names Committee in 1960. Ketley was named for John Ketley, a Falkland Islands Dependencies Survey (FIDS) assistant surveyor at the Danco Island station in 1956 and at Arthur Harbour in 1957. Sherlac was initially named "Cap Charles" by Gerlache, but to avoid confusion with Charles Point in Hughes Bay, it was renamed "Sherlac", an anagram of Charles.

See also
 Gerlache Strait Geology
 Composite Antarctic Gazetteer
 List of Antarctic and sub-Antarctic islands
 List of Antarctic islands south of 60° S
 Pauls Hole
 SCAR
 Territorial claims in Antarctica

References

Islands of Graham Land
Danco Coast